is a Japanese football player. He plays for Iwate Grulla Morioka.

Career
Kentaro Kai joined J2 League club FC Gifu in 2016.

Club statistics
Updated to 22 February 2018.

References

External links
Profile at Gainare Tottori

1994 births
Living people
Hannan University alumni
Association football people from Osaka Prefecture
Sportspeople from Osaka Prefecture
Japanese footballers
J2 League players
J3 League players
FC Gifu players
Gainare Tottori players
Iwate Grulla Morioka players
Association football defenders